Geerite is a copper sulfide mineral with the chemical formula Cu8S5.  The mineral is named after the original collector, Adam Geer, of Utica, New York, US.

Crystallography
Geerite is in the crystal class . This means that the crystal could be inverted and then rotated by 120 degrees to return to its original position. The optical class of geerite is unknown. Geerite is anisotropic which means that it will show interference colors when it is rotated in cross polarized light and that the mineral has different properties in different directions

Discovery and occurrence
It was first described in 1980 for an occurrence as thin coatings or platelets replacing sphalerite in the type locality in De Kalb Township, Saint Lawrence County, New York. It also occurs in a magnetite–chromite a serpentinite-hosted deposit in Eretria, Greece. It occurs associated with spionkopite, sphalerite, tetrahedrite, chalcopyrite, malachite, azurite, brochantite, chrysocolla, cervantite, stibiconite, hemimorphite and calcite in the type locality; and with spionkopite, chalcopyrite, cobaltian pentlandite, magnetite, chromite, andradite, chlorite, diopside in the Eretria deposit.
It has also been reported from a variety of locations worldwide, including the Logatchev-1 hydrothermal field along the Mid-Atlantic Ridge complex.

It has been used to study crystal structure and bonding in copper sulfides.

See also
Copper sulfide

References 

http://www.mineralienatlas.de/lexikon/index.php/MineralData?mineral=Geerite
Goble, R.J.(1985) The Relationship Between Crystal Structure, Bonding, and Cell Dimension in the Copper Sulfides. Canadian Mineralogist, 23, 61-76.

Copper(I,II) minerals
Sulfide minerals
Trigonal minerals
Minerals in space group 155
Minerals in space group 160
Minerals in space group 166